American pop singer Britney Spears made her chart debut in November 1998 with "...Baby One More Time", which attained global success. It was followed by the release of her debut studio album ...Baby One More Time (1999), which opened at number one on the Canadian Albums Chart and the US Billboard 200, and was later certified fourteen-times platinum by the Recording Industry Association of America (RIAA). Spears's second studio album, Oops!... I Did It Again, was released on May 16, 2000, and became the fastest-selling album by a female act in the US, selling 1,319,193 units in its opening week. It spawned the singles "Oops!... I Did It Again", "Lucky", "Stronger", and "Don't Let Me Be the Last to Know". In November 2001, Spears's released "I'm a Slave 4 U", the lead single from her self-titled third studio album (2001). In November 2003, Spears's fourth studio album, In the Zone, was released. The album includes "Me Against the Music", a collaboration with Madonna that reached number one on the European Hot 100 Singles, and "Toxic", which earned Spears her first Grammy Award in the category Best Dance Recording. Her first compilation album, Greatest Hits: My Prerogative, was released the following year.

Following her personal struggles through 2007, Spears's fifth studio album, Blackout, was released in October of the same year. The album sold over three million units worldwide, spawning the hit singles "Gimme More" and "Piece of Me". With the release of her sixth studio album Circus (2008), Spears became the only act in the Nielsen SoundScan era (1991–present) to have four albums debut with US sales of 500,000 or more copies. Including the singles "Womanizer" and "Circus", it sold four million copies worldwide.

Spears's third compilation album, The Singles Collection (2009), includes her third US number-one single "3". In 2011, Spears released the single "Hold It Against Me", making her the second artist in the Billboard Hot 100 chart's 52-year history to debut at number one with two or more songs, after Mariah Carey. The track was included on her seventh studio album Femme Fatale (2011), which debuted at number one on the US Billboard 200. Spears's eighth studio album, Britney Jean, was released in 2013; it made little commercial impact and received mixed reviews from critics but spawned the hit single "Work Bitch", which was certified platinum in the United States. Glory, the ninth studio album from Spears, was released in August 2016 to critical praise and chart success but failed to reach the success of her other albums.

Spears has sold over 100 million records worldwide and more than 28.6 million digital singles in the US alone, making her one of the best-selling music artists of all time. Billboard ranked her as the eighth-overall Artist of the Decade; it also recognized her as the best-selling female album artist of the first decade of the 21st century and the fifth overall. The RIAA also recognized Spears as the eighth top-selling female artist in the US, with 34.5 million certified albums. Spears is among the few artists in history to have had a number-one single and a number-one album in each of the three decades of their career (1990s, 2000s, and 2010s).

Songs

References

 
Spears, Britney